Taebla River is a river in Lääne County, Estonia. The river is 33.5 km long and basin size is 114.2 km2. It runs into Baltic Sea.

References

Rivers of Estonia
Lääne County